Macheto (also, Ma-che-to and Machayto) is a former Awani settlement in Mariposa County, California. 

It was located at the foot of Indian Canyon in Yosemite Valley, near Notomidula, in present-day Yosemite National Park.

References

Paiute villages
Former Native American populated places in the Sierra Nevada (United States)
Former settlements in Mariposa County, California
Yosemite National Park
Former Native American populated places in California